The Beaumont Commercial District is located in Downtown Beaumont, Texas. The district consists of various styles of buildings, including 6 highrises built before 1932. The district is registered on the National Register of Historic Places as a U.S. Historic District. The historic district is roughly bounded by Willow, Neches, Gilbert and Main Streets. The Old Spanish Trail (U.S. Route 90) travels through Downtown on Willow, Park, Pearl and College Streets.

Contributing buildings

Government/Public Services

Jack Brooks Federal Building

Office Building

Crockett Street (5 Buildings)
San Jacinto Building
Goodhue Building
Orleans Building
First National Bank Building
First City Building
Kyle Building
Gilbert Building
Nathan Building
Fertitta Building
McFaddin Building
Boykin Building
Rotan Mosle Building
Friedman Building
Hegele Building
Coale Building
Stedman Fruit Co.
Rosemont Building
Beaumont Savings
The White House (Now Municipal Court building.)
Santa Fe Warehouse
Neches Electric
Oil City Brass Works
Shepherd's Laundry
Quality Cafe
652 Park St.
268 Pearl St., circa 1899 (now vacant; formerly Modern Methods Printing; formerly Plummer Printing; formerly site of first Conn's Appliance Store)
278 Pearl St., circa 1899 (now The Willard Hall Law Firm; formerly Hall and Hall Real Estate; Formerly Szaffer's Stationery Supply)
220 Willow St.

Hotel
Hotel Beaumont
Edson Hotel

Auditorium/Entertainment

Jefferson Theatre
Julie Rogers Theater

Church

Tyrrell Historical Library (Formerly First Baptist)
Antioch Baptist Church (now lofts)

Photo gallery

Major Non-Contributing Buildings

Art Museum of Southeast Texas

See also

National Register of Historic Places listings in Jefferson County, Texas
Recorded Texas Historic Landmarks in Jefferson County

References

External links
National Register of Historic Places Inventory--Nomination Form: Beaumont Commercial District
National Register of Historic Places Registration Form: Beaumont Commercial District  (Boundary and Period of Significance Increase)

Geography of Beaumont, Texas
Historic districts on the National Register of Historic Places in Texas
National Register of Historic Places in Jefferson County, Texas